Consumer News and Business Channel Indonesia (known as CNBC Indonesia and abbreviated as CNBC ID) is an Indonesian television network owned by Trans Media in collaboration with Comcast's NBCUniversal under CNBC license. Launched on 10 October 2018, and began Free-to-air broadcast on digital terrestrial television since 2020 with carrying this channel by Trans TV and Trans7 digital transmitter rest of Indonesia. The channel is the second business-oriented news channel in Indonesia after IDX Channel.

History 
Businessman Chairul Tanjung announced the birth of a strategic partnership between NBCUniversal and Trans Media to launch a CNBC-branded channel in Indonesia. CNBC Indonesia was soft-launched as an online business news portal in the Indonesian language on 8 February 2018 and was officially launched as a business news channel on 10 October 2018.

In early February 2020, the channel launched its own HD feed on the Telkom 4 Merah Putih satellite.

Presenters

Current 
Maria Anneke Wijaya (ex-news anchor SCTV and Kompas TV)
Syarifa Rahma (ex-news anchor NET.)
Maria Katarina (ex-news anchor iNews and IDX Channel)
Andi Shalini
Safrina Nasution (ex-news anchor BTV)
Savira Wardoyo
Bramudya Prabowo (ex-news anchor MNC News)
Shinta Zahara (ex-news anchor NET.)
Shafinaz Nachiar (ex-news anchor Jak TV and RCTI)
Bunga Cinka
Dina Gurning
Sukma Kartini

Former presenters 
Mercy Andrea
Hera F. Haryn
Pangeran Punce
Muhammad Gibran
Peter F. Gontha
Juanita Aline Wiratmaja
Erwin Surya Brata
Ellen Gracia Natalia
Exist In Exist
Daniel Wiguna
Monica Chua
Dian Mirza (returned to MNC Media but on iNews, MNC News and IDX Channel)

List of programmes 

 Managing Asia (from CNBC Asia)
 Profit
 Number's Bite
 Iconomics
 CNBC Indonesia Exclusive
 Squawk Box Indonesia
 Power Lunch Indonesia
 Closing Bell Indonesia
 Evening Up
 Impact with Peter Gontha (previously aired on BeritaSatu)
 INVESTime
 Trans Media's Anniversary Party (annual program)
 CNBC Indonesia's Anniversary Special Program (annual program)
 CNBC Indonesia Bright Awards (annual program)
 Economic Outlook (annual program)

References

External links 
 Official website 

CNBC global channels
Business-related television channels
24-hour television news channels in Indonesia
Television networks in Indonesia
Mass media in Jakarta
Television channels and stations established in 2018
2018 establishments in Indonesia
Trans Media